Dilip Datta Walse (born 30 October 1956) is an Indian politician, from Ambegaon, Maharashtra, and a seven-time Member of the Maharashtra Legislative Assembly from Nationalist Congress Party (NCP). He served as the Minister of Home Affairs in the Government of Maharashtra. He formerly headed the Ministry of Finance and Planning, Energy Ministry, Higher and Technical Education Ministry, and Medical Education Ministry, all as a Cabinet Minister from 1999 to 2009.

He also serves as the President of National Federation of Cooperative Sugar Factories Limited (NFCSF).

He became Maharashtra's Home Minister on 5 April 2021 succeeding Anil Deshmukh who resigned due to graft charges.

Career
Walse-Patil is a member of the Nationalist Congress Party, and known to be a close associate of party President Sharad Pawar. Walse-Patil earlier served in the Government of Maharashtra as a minister with different portfolios such as Finance and Planning, Energy, Higher and Technical Education, and Medical Education.

Walse-Patil comes from a political family. He started his political career as a PA to Sharad Pawar, former Chief Minister of Maharashtra. He defeated Kisanrao Bankhele in Ambegaon in 1990 to become a MLA for the first time.  At present he is still representing the same constituency for sixth consecutive term.

Apart from the energy portfolio, Walse Patil also held the education portfolio in the Maharashtra cabinet.

Changes to make the admission procedure for medical seats more transparent were made during his tenure. He also encouraged the setup of new engineering colleges by easing the approval process. Maharashtra Knowledge Corporation (MKCL) is his creation, which has more than 5000 MSCIT centers all over Maharashtra. He played a key role in the establishment of Government College of Engineering as well as Polytechnic and engineering in 2009 at Avsari (K).

He took charge of the Ministry of Home Affairs replacing Anil Deshmukh in the Thackeray ministry after the latter resigned due to graft charges, on 5 April 2021.

References

Marathi politicians
Maharashtra MLAs 1990–1995
Living people
Speakers of the Maharashtra Legislative Assembly
Maharashtra MLAs 2009–2014
Nationalist Congress Party politicians from Maharashtra
People from Pune district
Maharashtra MLAs 2014–2019
1956 births